

Events

Pre-1600
 954 – The 13-year-old Lothair III is crowned at the Abbey of Saint-Remi as king of the West Frankish Kingdom.
1028 – Future Byzantine empress Zoe takes the throne as empress consort to Romanos III Argyros.
1330 – Battle of Posada ends: Wallachian Voievode Basarab I defeats the Hungarian army by ambush.
1439 – Plymouth becomes the first town incorporated by the English Parliament.

1601–1900
1835 – Construction is completed on the Wilberforce Monument in Kingston Upon Hull.
1892 – Pudge Heffelfinger becomes the first professional American football player on record, participating in his first paid game for the Allegheny Athletic Association.
1893 – Abdur Rahman Khan accepts the Durand Line as the border between the Emirate of Afghanistan and the British Raj.

1901–present
1905 – Norway holds a referendum resulting in popular approval of the Storting's decision to authorise the government to make the offer of the throne of the newly independent country.
1912 – First Balkan War: King George I of Greece makes a triumphal entry into Thessaloniki after its liberation from 482 years of Ottoman rule.
  1912   – The frozen bodies of Robert Scott and his men are found on the Ross Ice Shelf in Antarctica.
1918 – Dissolution of Austria-Hungary: Austria becomes a republic. After the proclamation, a coup attempt by the communist Red Guard is defeated by the social-democratic Volkswehr.
1920 – Italy and the Kingdom of Serbs, Croats and Slovenes sign the Treaty of Rapallo.
1927 – Leon Trotsky is expelled from the Soviet Communist Party, leaving Joseph Stalin in undisputed control of the Soviet Union.
1933 – Nazi Germany uses a referendum to ratify its withdrawal from the League of Nations.
1936 – In California, the San Francisco–Oakland Bay Bridge opens to traffic.
1938 – Nazi Germany issues the Decree on the Elimination of Jews from Economic Life prohibiting Jews from selling goods and services or working in a trade, totally segregating Jews from the German economy. 
1940 – World War II: The Battle of Gabon ends as Free French Forces take Libreville, Gabon, and all of French Equatorial Africa from Vichy French forces.
  1940   – World War II: Soviet Foreign Minister Vyacheslav Molotov arrives in Berlin to discuss the possibility of the Soviet Union joining the Axis Powers.
  1941   – World War II: The  is destroyed during the Battle of Sevastopol.
1942 – World War II: Naval Battle of Guadalcanal between Japanese and American forces begins near Guadalcanal. The battle lasts for three days and ends with an American victory.
1944 – World War II: The Royal Air Force launches 29 Avro Lancaster bombers, which sink the German battleship Tirpitz, with 12,000 lb Tallboy bombs off Tromsø, Norway.
1948 – Aftermath of World War II: In Tokyo, the International Military Tribunal for the Far East sentences seven Japanese military and government officials, including General Hideki Tojo, to death for their roles in World War II.
1954 – Ellis Island ceases operations.
1956 – Morocco, Sudan and Tunisia join the United Nations.
  1956   – In the midst of the Suez Crisis, Palestinian refugees are shot dead in Rafah by Israel Defense Force soldiers following the invasion of the Gaza Strip.
1958 – A team of rock climbers led by Warren Harding completes the first ascent of The Nose on El Capitan in Yosemite Valley.
1961 – Terry Jo Duperrault is the sole survivor of a series of brutal murders aboard the ketch Bluebelle.
1969 – Vietnam War: Independent investigative journalist Seymour Hersh breaks the story of the My Lai Massacre. 
1970 – The Oregon Highway Division attempts to destroy a rotting beached sperm whale with explosives, leading to the now infamous "exploding whale" incident.
  1970   – The 1970 Bhola cyclone makes landfall on the coast of East Pakistan, becoming the deadliest tropical cyclone in history.
1971 – Vietnam War: As part of Vietnamization, U.S. President Richard Nixon sets February 1, 1972 as the deadline for the removal of another 45,000 American troops from Vietnam.
1975 – The Comoros joins the United Nations.
1977 – France conducts the Oreste nuclear test as 14th in the group of 29, 1975–78 French nuclear tests series.
1979 – Iran hostage crisis: In response to the hostage situation in Tehran, U.S. President Jimmy Carter orders a halt to all petroleum imports into the United States from Iran.
1980 – The NASA space probe Voyager I makes its closest approach to Saturn and takes the first images of its rings.
1981 – Space Shuttle program: Mission STS-2, utilizing the Space Shuttle Columbia, marks the first time a crewed spacecraft is launched into space twice.
1982 – USSR: Yuri Andropov becomes the General Secretary of the Communist Party's Central Committee, succeeding Leonid I. Brezhnev.
1990 – Crown Prince Akihito is formally installed as Emperor Akihito of Japan, becoming the 125th Japanese monarch.
  1990   – Tim Berners-Lee publishes a formal proposal for the World Wide Web.
1991 – Santa Cruz massacre: The Indonesian Army open fire on a crowd of student protesters in Dili, East Timor.
1995 – Erdut Agreement regarding the peaceful resolution to the Croatian War of Independence is reached.
1996 – A Saudi Arabian Airlines Boeing 747 and a Kazakh Ilyushin Il-76 cargo plane collide in mid-air near New Delhi, killing 349 in the deadliest mid-air collision to date.
1997 – Ramzi Yousef is found guilty of masterminding the 1993 World Trade Center bombing.
1999 – The 7.2  Düzce earthquake shakes northwestern Turkey with a maximum Mercalli intensity of IX (Violent). At least 845 people are killed and almost 5,000 are injured.
2001 – In New York City, American Airlines Flight 587, an Airbus A300 en route to the Dominican Republic, crashes minutes after takeoff from John F. Kennedy International Airport, killing all 260 on board and five on the ground.
  2001   – War in Afghanistan: Taliban forces abandon Kabul, ahead of advancing Afghan Northern Alliance troops.
2003 – Iraq War: In Nasiriyah, Iraq, at least 23 people, among them the first Italian casualties of the 2003 invasion of Iraq, are killed in a suicide bomb attack on an Italian police base.
2011 – Silvio Berlusconi tenders his resignation as Prime Minister of Italy, effective November 16, due in large part to the European sovereign debt crisis.
  2011   – A blast in Iran's Shahid Modarres missile base leads to the death of 17 of the Revolutionary Guards members, including Hassan Tehrani Moghaddam, a key figure in Iran's missile program.
2014 – The Philae lander, deployed from the European Space Agency's Rosetta probe, reaches the surface of Comet 67P/Churyumov–Gerasimenko.
2015 –  Two suicide bombers detonate explosives in Bourj el-Barajneh, Beirut, killing 43 people and injuring over 200 others.
2017 – The 7.3  Kermanshah earthquake shakes the northern Iran–Iraq border with a maximum Mercalli intensity of VIII (Severe). At least 410 people are killed and over 7,000 are injured.
2021 – The Los Angeles Superior Court formally ends the 14-year conservatorship to pop singer Britney Spears.

Births

Pre-1600
1450 – Jacques of Savoy, Count of Romont, Prince of Savoy (d. 1486)
1492 – Johan Rantzau, German general (d. 1565)
1494 – Margaret of Anhalt-Köthen, Princess of Anhalt by birth, by marriage Duchess of Saxony (d. 1521)
1528 – Qi Jiguang, Chinese general (d. 1588)
1547 – Claude of Valois (d. 1575)
1579 – Albrecht of Hanau-Münzenberg, German nobleman (d. 1635)

1601–1900
1606 – Jeanne Mance, French-Canadian nurse, founded the Hôtel-Dieu de Montréal (d. 1673)
1615 – Richard Baxter, English minister, poet, and theologian (d. 1691)
1627 – Diego Luis de San Vitores, Spanish Jesuit missionary (d. 1672)
1651 – Juana Inés de la Cruz, Mexican nun, poet, and scholar (d. 1695)
1655 – Francis Nicholson, British Army general and colonial administrator (d. 1727)
1684 – Edward Vernon, English admiral and politician (d. 1757)
1729 – Louis Antoine de Bougainville, French admiral and explorer (d. 1811)
1755 – Gerhard von Scharnhorst, Prussian general and politician, Prussian Minister of War (d. 1813)
1780 – Piet Retief, South African ruler (d. 1838)
1793 – Johann Friedrich von Eschscholtz, Livonian physician and botanist (d. 1831)
1795 – Thaddeus William Harris, American entomologist and botanist (d. 1856)
1815 – Elizabeth Cady Stanton, American activist (d. 1902)
1817 – Bahá'u'lláh, Persian spiritual leader, founded the Baháʼí Faith (d. 1892)
1833 – Alexander Borodin, Russian composer and chemist (d. 1887)
1840 – Auguste Rodin, French sculptor and illustrator, created The Thinker (d. 1917)
1842 – John William Strutt, 3rd Baron Rayleigh, English physicist and academic, Nobel Prize laureate (d. 1919)
1848 – Eduard Müller, Swiss lawyer and politician, 51st President of the Swiss Confederation (d. 1919)
1850 – Mikhail Chigorin, Russian chess player and theoretician (d. 1908)
1866 – Sun Yat-sen, Chinese physician and politician, 1st President of the Republic of China (d. 1925)
1872 – William Fay, Irish actor and producer (d. 1947)
1881 – Olev Siinmaa, Estonian-Swedish architect (d. 1948)
  1881   – Maximilian von Weichs, German field marshal (d. 1954)
1886 – Günther Dyhrenfurth, German geologist and mountaineer (d. 1975)
  1886   – Ben Travers, English author and playwright (d. 1980)
1889 – DeWitt Wallace, American publisher and philanthropist, co-founded Reader's Digest (d. 1981)
1890 – Lily Kronberger, Hungarian figure skater (d. 1974)
1892 – Tudor Davies, Welsh tenor and actor (d. 1958)
1894 – Thorleif Schjelderup-Ebbe, Norwegian zoologist and comparative psychologist (d. 1976)
1895 – Manuel Alonso Areizaga, Spanish tennis player (d. 1984)
  1895   – Nima Yooshij, Iranian poet and academic (d. 1960)
1896 – Salim Ali, Indian ornithologist and author (d. 1987)
1897 – Karl Marx, German composer and conductor (d. 1985)
1898 – Leon Štukelj, Slovenian gymnast (d. 1999)
1900 – Stanley Graham, New Zealand mass murderer (d. 1941)

1901–present
1901 – James Luther Adams, American minister and theologian (d. 1994)
1903 – Jack Oakie, American actor (d. 1978)
1904 – Max Hoffman, Austrian-born car importer and businessman (d. 1981)
1905 – Louise Thaden, American pilot (d. 1979)
1906 – George Dillon, American soldier and poet (d. 1968)
1908 – Harry Blackmun, American lawyer and judge (d. 1999)
1910 – Dudley Nourse, South African cricketer (d. 1981)
1911 – Buck Clayton, American trumpet player and academic (d. 1991)
1915 – Roland Barthes, French philosopher, theorist, and critic (d. 1980)
1916 – Paul Emery, English racing driver (d. 1993)
  1916   – Jean Papineau-Couture, Canadian composer and academic (d. 2000)
1917 – Jo Stafford, American singer (d. 2008)
1919 – France Štiglic, Slovenian film director and screenwriter (d. 1993)
1920 – Richard Quine, American actor, director, and screenwriter (d. 1989)
1922 – Tadeusz Borowski, Polish poet, author, and journalist (d. 1951)
  1922   – Kim Hunter, American actress (d. 2002)
1923 – Vicco von Bülow, German humorist, actor, and director (d. 2011)
  1923   – Ian Graham, English archaeologist and explorer (d. 2017)
  1923   – Rubén Bonifaz Nuño, Mexican poet and scholar (d. 2013)
1924 – Sam Jones, American bassist, cellist, and composer (d. 1981)
1926 – Robert Goff, Baron Goff of Chieveley, English lawyer and judge (d. 2016)
1927 – František Šťastný, Czech motorcycle racer and sportscaster (d. 2000)
  1927   – Yutaka Taniyama, Japanese mathematician and theorist (d. 1958)
1929 – Michael Ende, German author and fiction writer (d. 1995)
  1929   – Grace Kelly, American actress, later Princess Grace of Monaco (d. 1982)
1930 – Bob Crewe, American singer-songwriter and producer (d. 2014)
1934 – Charles Manson, American cult leader (d. 2017)
  1934   – John McGahern, Irish author and educator (d. 2006)
  1934   – Vavá, Brazilian footballer and manager (d. 2002)
1938 – Denis DeJordy, Canadian ice hockey player and coach
  1938   – Benjamin Mkapa, Tanzanian journalist and politician, 3rd President of Tanzania (d. 2020)
  1938   – Mort Shuman, American singer-songwriter and pianist (d. 1991)
1939 – Lucia Popp, Slovak soprano (d. 1993)
1940 – Amjad Khan, Indian actor & director (d. 1992)
  1940   – Michel Audet, Canadian economist and politician
  1940   – Jürgen Todenhöfer, German judge and politician
1943 – Errol Brown, Jamaican-English singer-songwriter (d. 2015)
  1943   – Brian Hyland, American pop singer
  1943   – Wallace Shawn, American actor, comedian and playwright
  1943   – Björn Waldegård, Swedish racing driver (d. 2014)
  1943   – John Walker, American singer-songwriter and guitarist (d. 2011)
1944 – Booker T. Jones, American pianist, saxophonist, songwriter, and producer 
  1944   – Al Michaels, American sportscaster
1945 – Michael Bishop, American author and educator
  1945   – Neil Young, Canadian singer-songwriter, guitarist, and producer 
  1945 – Judith Roitman, American mathematician and academic
1946 – Alexandra Charles, Swedish businesswoman
1947 – Buck Dharma, American singer-songwriter and guitarist 
  1947 – Patrice Leconte, French director and screenwriter
1948 – Hassan Rouhani, Iranian lawyer and politician; 7th President of Iran
1949 – Ron Lapointe, Canadian ice hockey player and coach (d. 1992)
  1949 – Jack Reed, American soldier and politician
1950 – Barbara Fairchild, American country and gospel singer-songwriter 
1953 – Baaba Maal, Senegalese singer-songwriter and guitarist
1954 – Paul McNamee, Australian tennis player
1955 – Les McKeown, Scottish pop singer (d. 2021)
1957 – Tim Samaras, American engineer, storm chaser (d. 2013)
1958 – Megan Mullally, American actress and singer
  1958   – Mykola Vynnychenko, Ukrainian race walker
1959 – Vincent Irizarry, American actor
  1959   – Toshihiko Sahashi, Japanese composer
1960 – Maurane, Belgian singer and actress (d. 2018)
1961 – Nadia Comăneci, Romanian gymnast and coach
  1961   – Enzo Francescoli, Uruguayan footballer
1962 – Kuniko Asagi, Japanese actress and television host
  1962   – Jon Dough, American porn actor, director, and producer (d. 2006)
  1962   – Mariella Frostrup, British journalist and actress
  1962   – Mark Hunter, Canadian ice hockey player, coach, and manager
  1962   – Neal Shusterman, American author and poet
  1962   – Naomi Wolf, American author and activist 
1964 – Vic Chesnutt, American singer-songwriter and guitarist (d. 2009)
  1964   – David Ellefson, American bass player and songwriter 
  1964   – Wang Kuang-hui, Taiwanese baseball player and coach
  1964   – Barbara Stühlmeyer, German musicologist, church musician and writer
1965 – Lex Lang, American voice actor and producer
1967 – Bassim Al-Karbalaei, Iraqi Eulogy Reciter
  1967   – Disco Inferno, American wrestler and manager 
  1967   – Iryna Khalip, Belarusian journalist
  1967   – Michael Moorer, American boxer
  1967   – Grant Nicholas, Welsh singer-songwriter and guitarist
1968 – Kathleen Hanna, American singer-songwriter 
  1968   – Sammy Sosa, Dominican-American baseball player
  1968   – Aaron Stainthorpe, English-German singer-songwriter 
1969 – Ian Bremmer, American political scientist and author
  1969   – Jason Cundy, English footballer and sportscaster
  1969   – Rob Schrab, American writer and artist
1970 – Elektra, American wrestler, model, and dancer
  1970   – Tonya Harding, American figure skater
  1970   – Sarah Harmer, Canadian singer-songwriter and guitarist
  1970   – Oscar Strasnoy, French-Argentine composer
1971 – Chen Guangcheng, Chinese-American lawyer and activist
1972 – Vassilios Tsiartas, Greek footballer
1973 – Radha Mitchell, Australian actress 
1974 – Alessandro Birindelli, Italian footballer
1975 – Kiara Bisaro, Canadian mountain biker
  1975   – Jason Lezak, American swimmer
1976 – Tevin Campbell, American R&B singer-songwriter and actor
  1976   – Judith Holofernes, German singer-songwriter and guitarist 
  1976   – Richelle Mead, American author and educator
  1976   – Mirosław Szymkowiak, Polish footballer and journalist
1977 – Benni McCarthy, South African footballer
  1977   – Lee Murray, English mixed martial artist
1978 – Alexandra Maria Lara, Romanian-German actress
  1978   – Mista, Spanish footballer
  1978   – Ashley Williams, American actress
1979 – Matt Cappotelli, American wrestler and trainer (d. 2018)
  1979   – Cote de Pablo, Chilean actress 
  1979   – Lucas Glover, American golfer
  1979   – Corey Maggette, American basketball player and sportscaster
  1979   – Matt Stevic, Australian footballer and umpire
1980 – Shaun Cooper, American bass player 
  1980   – Nur Fettahoğlu, German-Turkish journalist and actress
  1980   – Ryan Gosling, Canadian actor, producer and singer
  1980   – Charlie Hodgson, English rugby player
1981 – Annika Becker, German pole vaulter
  1981   – DJ Campbell, English footballer
  1981   – Sergio Floccari, Italian footballer
1982 – Anne Hathaway, American actress 
  1982   – Mikele Leigertwood, English footballer
1983 – Charlie Morton, American baseball player
1984 – Sepp De Roover, Belgian footballer
  1984   – Jorge Masvidal, American Mixed Martial Artist
  1984   – Omarion, American singer, songwriter, actor and dancer 
  1984   – Sandara Park, South Korean singer, dancer, and actress 
  1984   – Conrad Rautenbach, Zimbabwean racing driver
1985 – Arianny Celeste, American model and actress
  1985   – Adlène Guedioura, French-Algerian footballer
1986 – Ignazio Abate, Italian footballer
  1986   – Nedum Onuoha, English footballer
1987 – Jason Day, Australian golfer
  1987   – Kengo Kora, Japanese actor
1988 – Russell Westbrook, American basketball player
1989 – Hiroshi Kiyotake, Japanese footballer
1990 – Adrianna Franch, American soccer player
  1990   – Florent Manaudou, French swimmer
  1990   – Harmeet Singh, Norwegian footballer
  1990   – Siim-Sander Vene, Estonian basketball player
1991 – Gijs Van Hoecke, Belgian cyclist
1992 – Trey Burke, American basketball player
  1992   – Adam Larsson, Swedish ice hockey player
  1992   – Luguelín Santos, Dominican sprinter
1994 – Guillaume Cizeron, French ice dancer
1999 – Choi Yoo-jung, South Korean singer, dancer, rapper, and actress

Deaths

Pre-1600
 607 – Pope Boniface III
 657 – Livinus, Irish apostle (b. c.580) 
 973 – Burchard III, Frankish nobleman (b. c.915) 
 975 – Notker Physicus, Swiss painter
1035 – Cnut the Great, Danish-English king (b. c.995)
1087 – William I, Count of Burgundy (b. 1020)
1094 – Duncan II of Scotland (b. 1060)
1202 – Canute VI of Denmark (b. 1163)
1209 – Phillipe de Plessis, Grand Master of the Knights Templar (b. 1165)
1218 – Henry de Abergavenny, Prior of Abergavenny and Bishop of Llandaff
1347 – John of Viktring, Austrian chronicler and political advisor (b. c.1270)
1375 – John Henry, Margrave of Moravia (b. 1322)
1434 – Louis III of Anjou (b. 1403)
1555 – Stephen Gardiner, English bishop and politician, English Secretary of State (b. 1497)
  1555   – Yang Jisheng (b. 1516), Ming dynasty official and Confucian martyr
  1555   – Zhang Jing, Ming Chinese general
1562 – Pietro Martire Vermigli, Italian theologian (b. 1500)
1567 – Anne de Montmorency, French general and diplomat (b. 1493)
1572 – Henry of Stolberg, German nobleman (b. 1509)
1595 – John Hawkins, English admiral and shipbuilder (b. 1532)

1601–1900
1623 – Josaphat Kuntsevych, Lithuanian archbishop (b. c. 1582)
1667 – Hans Nansen, Danish politician (b. 1598)
1671 – Thomas Fairfax, English general and politician (b. 1612)
1742 – Friedrich Hoffmann, German physician and chemist (b. 1660)
1793 – Jean Sylvain Bailly, French astronomer, mathematician, and politician, 1st Mayor of Paris (b. 1736)
  1793   – Lord George Gordon, English politician (b. 1751)
1836 – Juan Ramón Balcarce, Argentinian general and politician, 6th Governor of Buenos Aires Province (b. 1773)
1847 – William Christopher Zeise, Danish chemist who prepared Zeise's salt, one of the first organometallic compounds (b. 1789)
1865 – Elizabeth Gaskell, English author (b. 1810)
1896 – Joseph James Cheeseman, Liberian politician, 12th President of Liberia (b. 1843)

1901–present
1902 – William Henry Barlow, English engineer (b. 1812)
1916 – Percival Lowell, American astronomer, mathematician, and author (b. 1855)
1933 – John Cady, American golfer (b. 1866)
  1933   – F. Holland Day, American photographer and publisher (b. 1864)
1939 – Norman Bethune, Canadian physician and humanitarian (b. 1890)
1942 – Maurice O'Neill, executed Irish Republican
1946 – Albert Bond Lambert, American golfer and pilot (b. 1875)
  1946   – Madan Mohan Malaviya, Indian academic and politician, President of the Indian National Congress (b. 1861)
1948 – Umberto Giordano, Italian composer (b. 1867)
1950 – Lesley Ashburner, American hurdler (b. 1883)
  1950   – Julia Marlowe, English-American actress (b. 1865)
1955 – Alfréd Hajós, Hungarian swimmer and architect, designed the Grand Hotel Aranybika (b. 1878)
  1955   – Tin Ujević, Croatian poet and translator (b. 1891)
  1955   – Sarah Wambaugh, American political scientist, world authority on plebiscites (b. 1882)
1958 – Gustaf Söderström, Swedish shot putter, discus thrower, and tug of war competitor (b. 1865)
1962 – Roque González Garza, Mexican general and acting president (1915) (b. 1885)
1965 – Taher Saifuddin, Indian spiritual leader, 51st Da'i al-Mutlaq (b. 1888)
1969 – Liu Shaoqi, Chinese politician, 2nd Chairman of the People's Republic of China (b. 1898)
1971 – Johanna von Caemmerer, German mathematician (b. 1914)
1972 – Rudolf Friml, Czech-American pianist and composer (b. 1879)
  1972   – Tommy Wisdom, English racing driver and journalist (b. 1906)
1976 – Mikhail Gurevich, Russian engineer, co-founded Mikoyan (b. 1893)
  1976   – Walter Piston, American composer and academic (b. 1894)
1981 – William Holden, American actor (b. 1918)
1986 – Minoru Yasui, American lawyer and activist (b. 1916)
1990 – Eve Arden, American actress and comedian (b. 1908)
1991 – Gabriele Tinti, Italian actor (b. 1932)
1993 – H. R. Haldeman, American diplomat, 4th White House Chief of Staff (b. 1926)
1994 – Wilma Rudolph, American sprinter and educator (b. 1940)
1997 – Carlos Surinach, Spanish-American composer and conductor (b. 1915)
1998 – Roy Hollis, English footballer (b. 1925)
  1998   – Sally Shlaer, American mathematician and engineer (b. 1938)
2000 – Franck Pourcel, French conductor and composer (b. 1913)
2001 – Albert Hague, German-American actor and composer (b. 1920)
  2001   – Tony Miles, English chess player and theoretician (b. 1955)
2003 – Jonathan Brandis, American actor (b. 1976)
  2003   – Cameron Duncan, New Zealand director and screenwriter (b. 1986)
  2003   – Penny Singleton, American actress (b. 1908)
  2003   – Tony Thompson, American drummer (b. 1954)
2007 – K. C. Ibrahim, Indian cricketer (b. 1919)
  2007   – Ira Levin, American novelist, playwright, and songwriter (b. 1929)
2008 – Catherine Baker Knoll, American educator and politician, 30th Lieutenant Governor of Pennsylvania (b. 1930)
  2008   – Mitch Mitchell, English drummer (b. 1947)
2010 – Henryk Górecki, Polish composer (b. 1933)
2012 – Hans Hammarskiöld, Swedish photographer (b. 1925)
  2012   – Sergio Oliva, Cuban-American bodybuilder (b. 1941)
  2012   – Daniel Stern, American psychologist and theorist (b. 1934)
2013 – Steve Rexe, Canadian ice hockey player and coach (b. 1947)
  2013   – Konrad Rudnicki, Polish astronomer and academic (b. 1926)
  2013   – Aleksandr Serebrov, Russian engineer and astronaut (b. 1944)
  2013   – John Tavener, English composer and educator (b. 1944)
  2013   – Kurt Trampedach, Danish painter and sculptor (b. 1943)
2014 – Ravi Chopra, Indian director and producer (b. 1946)
  2014   – Warren Clarke, English actor, director, and producer (b. 1947)
  2014   – Marge Roukema, American educator and politician (b. 1929)
  2014   – Valery Senderov, Russian mathematician and academic (b. 1945)
2015 – Márton Fülöp, Hungarian footballer (b. 1983)
  2015   – Jihadi John, terrorist (b. 1988)
2016 – Lupita Tovar, Mexican-American actress (b. 1910)
  2016   – Mahmoud Abdel Aziz, Egyptian Actor (b. 1946)
2018 – Stan Lee, American comic book writer, editor, and publisher (b. 1922)

Holidays and observances
Birth of Sun Yat-Sen, also Doctors' Day and Cultural Renaissance Day. (Republic of China)
Christian feast day:
Arsatius
Astrik (or Anastasius) of Pannonhalma
Cumméne Fota
Cunibert
Emilian of Cogolla
Imerius of Immertal
Josaphat Kuntsevych (Roman Catholic Church, Greek Catholic Church)
Lebuinus (Liafwine)
Livinus of Ghent
Machar
Margarito Flores García
Nilus of Sinai
Patiens
René d'Angers
Theodore the Studite
Ymar
November 12 (Eastern Orthodox liturgics)
Constitution Day (Azerbaijan)
Father's Day (Indonesia)
National Health Day (Indonesia)
National Youth Day (East Timor)
World Pneumonia Day

References

External links

 
 
 

Days of the year
November